Kogarah railway station is located on the Illawarra line, serving the Sydney suburb of Kogarah. It is served by Sydney Trains T4 line services.

History
Kogarah station opened on 15 October 1884 on the same date as the Illawarra line from Redfern to Hurstville with two side platforms.

The station concourse links directly to a small shopping mall called Kogarah Town Centre, which has been built directly over the railway platforms and beside them on Railway Parade.

Platforms & services

Transport links

Punchbowl Bus Company operates one route via Kogarah station:
446: to Roselands Shopping Centre

Transdev NSW operates three routes via Kogarah station:
455: Rockdale Plaza to Kingsgrove
947: to Hurstville
958: Rockdale Plaza to Hurstville

Transit Systems operate three routes via Kogarah station:
422: to Railway Square
476: Rockdale station to Dolls Point via Sans Souci
477: Rockdale station to Westfield Miranda via Sans Souci

Kogarah station is served by two NightRide routes:
N10: Sutherland station to Town Hall station
N11: Cronulla station to Town Hall station

References

External links

Kogarah station details Transport for New South Wales
Kogarah Station Public Transport Map Transport for NSW

Easy Access railway stations in Sydney
Railway stations in Sydney
Railway stations in Australia opened in 1884
Kogarah, New South Wales
Illawarra railway line